How You Luv That Vol. 2 is a re-release of the first album by rap duo Big Tymers released in late 1998. Cash Money re-released How You Luv That as How You Luv That Vol. 2 in late 1998 after signing its distribution deal with Universal Records. This re-release substitutes a remix of "Stun'n" for the original version and adds "Big Ballin'," "Money & Power," and "Drop It Like It's Hot.

The singles are "Big Ballin'" and "Stun'n (Remix)". Mannie Fresh produced the album. The album featured guests Bun B, Lil Wayne, Cadillac, Juvenile, Paparue & B.G. The upper middle of the cover shows B.G. (rapper) in pre-planned early artwork for his album, Chopper City In The Ghetto, which was released a year later.

Track listing 
 "Big Tymers Intro (Skit)" – 3:08  
 "Playboy (Don't Hate Me)" (featuring Bun B & Lil' Wayne) – 4:40
 "Big Ballin'" (featuring Chilli) – 4:39
 "Tear It Up" (featuring B.G. & Lil' Wayne) – 4:02
 "Phone Call (Skit)" – 1:25
 "How You Luv That?" (featuring Juvenile & Lil' Wayne) – 4:54
 "Cutlass, Monte Carlo's & Regals" (featuring Juvenile & Lil' Wayne) – 4:45
 "Money & Power" – 5:11
 "Millionaire Dream" (featuring Cadillac & Lil' Wayne) – 5:23
 "Beautiful" – 4:07
 "Ballin'" (featuring Bun B) – 5:08
 "Drop It Like It's Hot" (featuring Chilli, Juvenile & Cadillac) – 4:00
 "Top Of Tha Line Nigga" (featuring Lil' Wayne) – 4:20
 "Tell Me" (featuring Lil' Wayne) – 3:08
 "On Top Of The World" (featuring Chilli) – 5:03
 "Suga & Pac, Puff & Big (6 Fig)" (featuring B.G. & Lil' Wayne) – 4:35
 "How Should I Ride?" (featuring B.G. & Cadillac) – 3:44
 "Stun'n (Remix)" (featuring Lil' Wayne & Paparue) – 4:26

References

1998 albums
Big Tymers albums
Birdman (rapper) albums
Cash Money Records albums
Mannie Fresh albums
Albums produced by Mannie Fresh
Sequel albums